Rock Hall Museum can refer to:

 Rock Hall (Lawrence, New York), restored house museum
 Rock Hall Museum (Rock Hall, Maryland), a museum in Maryland